Rae Livingston Egbert (August 15, 1891 – May 11, 1964) was an American businessman and politician from New York.

Early years
He was born on August 15, 1891, on Staten Island, Richmond County, New York, the son of George L. Egbert (1862–1957) and Ella L. Turner (died 1919), and a descendant of the farming family for which Egbertville is named. He attended the public schools on Staten Island, and Mount Hermon School. In 1911, he began to work in his father's haberdashery in Tompkinsville. During World War I, he enlisted as a private in the U.S. Army, and remained stationed at Fox Hills, on Staten Island. He finished the war as a sergeant major.

Career
Egbert was a member of the New York State Senate (24th D.) from 1935 to 1940, sitting in the 158th, 159th, 160th, 161st and 162nd New York State Legislatures. He was defeated for re-election in 1940 and 1942. In 1944, he ran for Congress in the 16th District but was defeated by Republican Ellsworth B. Buck.

In 1958, he removed to Gulfport, Florida.

Family life
On June 4, 1917, he married Olive Doll, and they had one daughter: Joan Egbert.

Death
He died on May 11, 1964, while on a visit at his sister Grace's home in Stapleton, Staten Island.

Sources

1891 births
1964 deaths
Democratic Party New York (state) state senators
Politicians from Staten Island
People from Gulfport, Florida
20th-century American politicians
United States Army personnel of World War I
United States Army non-commissioned officers